Mohamed Coulibaly (born 17 May 1994), also known as Momo Coulibaly, is an Ivorian professional footballer who plays as a central midfielder for Portuguese club CD Alcains.

References

External links

Mohamed Coulibaly at playmakerstats.com (English version of leballonrond.fr)

1994 births
Living people
Ivorian footballers
Ivorian expatriate footballers
Expatriate footballers in Portugal
Ivorian expatriate sportspeople in Portugal
Expatriate footballers in Moldova
Ivorian expatriate sportspeople in Moldova
Associação Naval 1º de Maio players
Vilaverdense F.C. players
SC Mirandela players
SC Vianense players
S.C. Farense players
FC Zimbru Chișinău players
S.R. Almancilense players
GD Bragança players
A.D. Sanjoanense players
GS Loures players
Association football midfielders